SS Albert Ballin was an ocean liner of the Hamburg-America Line launched in 1923 and named after Albert Ballin, the visionary director of the Hamburg-America line, who had committed suicide several years earlier. In 1935, the ship was renamed Hansa on orders from the German government. Towards the end of World War II, she was employed to evacuate civilians during Operation Hannibal, and sank after hitting a mine.  She was later raised and refitted by the Soviet Union and was finally scrapped in 1982.

History

Hamburg America Line
 Albert Ballin was built by Blohm & Voss in Hamburg, and served on the Hamburg-New York City route. In 1928, a tourist class was added.  Originally built as a 16 knot ship, the engines were replaced in 1929, resulting in a speed of 19 knots. In 1934, she was lengthened by 50 feet, and speed increased again, this time to 21.5 knots.

In 1935, the new Nazi government ordered the ship be renamed Hansa (Ballin having been Jewish). Hansa's last Atlantic crossing was in 1939.  

In 1945, she was employed to evacuate civilians from Gotenhafen during Operation Hannibal, and was due to accompany the overloaded MV Wilhelm Gustloff leaving midday on 30 January, but suffered mechanical problems before the ships had left the Bay of Danzig and had to anchor. Later, on 6 March during a further evacuation, she hit a mine off Warnemünde and slowly sank.

Soviet Union
The wreck was raised and rebuilt by the Soviet Union around 1949, and renamed  Sovetskiy Soyuz  (meaning Soviet Union), becoming the largest passenger ship operating under the Soviet flag. From 1955, she operated between Vladivostok and points in the Far East. Renamed  Tobolsk  in 1980, she sailed under that name for almost two years before being scrapped.

See also 
 Stanislav Kurilov

References

External links
SS Albert Ballin - History, Accommodations, & Ephemera Collection GG Archives

Ships built in Hamburg
Ships of the Hamburg America Line
1922 ships
Ships sunk by mines
Maritime incidents in March 1945
Passenger ships of the Soviet Union